The kaupinam, kaupina, langot or lungooty is a loincloth worn by men in the Indian subcontinent as underclothing, it is now commonly worn by South Asian pehlwano wrestlers while exercising or sparring in a dangal. It is made up of a rectangular strip of cotton cloth used to cover the genitals with the help of the strings, connected to the four ends of the cloth for binding it around the waist. 

The small lungooty worn by naga sadhus or fakirs is also known as ''Coopees''.

Use

It is used extensively by wrestlers (pehelwans) in India participating in the traditional game of Pehlwani (a form of traditional wrestling). It is worn by wrestlers during matches, practice, training and exercises (kasrat).

The kaupinam in India is the traditional male sports gear associated with almost every form of physically straining sports like kushti and kabaddi. It has been worn by sportsmen and bodybuilders during training and exercise sessions (similar to the contemporary use of gym shorts) since ancient times and is still used in traditional sports. Langot was earlier worn (and is still worn sometimes) in India by men performing any form of physically straining activity. The wrestlers often wear a G-string-shaped guard underneath to protect their genitals.

The kaupinam is a very ancient form of sportswear and was in use since the early Vedic Period (2000–1500 BC) in India as is evident from a verse in the Sam Veda, the Hindu sacred scriptures, written at that time. The devotees of the Hindu god Shiva were said to be wearing kaupinam.

Religious significance

It has religious significance attached to asceticism for the Hindus. The Bhagavata Purana enjoins that a true ascetic should not wear anything other than a kaupina. Sometimes the god Shiva himself is depicted wearing Kaupina. The deities Murugan of Palani and Hanuman are said to be wearing this garment. Langot or kaupin is associated with celibacy. Adi Shankara composed a verse called Kaupina Panchakam to assert the significance of asceticism. Famous Maharashtrian saint Samarth Ramdas and Tamil saint Ramana Maharshi were always depicted wearing a langot in popular pictures.

Langota

The older Kapinaum form is distinct from the present-day Langota or Langoti which is sewn and covers the buttocks.  It was worn as underwear in dangal held at akharas. It is now mainly used by men when exercising and other intense physical games especially wrestling, to prevent hernias and hydrocele.

The loincloth is about 3" wide and 24" long single piece of cotton cloth. It is first put between the legs and then wrapped around the waist very tightly.

In media
A langot was worn by Mowgli, the main hero of The Jungle Book franchise including the
1942, 1967–1971, 1967), 1994, 2003, 2016, and 2018 films.

See also

 Similar Indian clothes
 Kacchera
 Related Indian clothes
 Clothing in India
 Dhoti
 Lungi
 Similar foreign clothes
 Bahag
 Breechcloth
 Fundoshi
 Loincloth
 Mawashi
 Perizoma
 Subligaculum
 Thong
 Related foreign clothes
 Tallit katan
 Temple garment: religious undergarments worn by many Mormons

References

External links
 How to wear, visual description.
 

Indian clothing
Undergarments
Asceticism
Hindu asceticism
Folk costumes